Hungarian Uruguayans are people born in Hungary who live in Uruguay or Uruguayan-born people of Hungarian descent.

Overview
Hungarian Uruguayans are a local ethnic minority; their presence is small but meaningful, numbering around 2,000-3,000 of which ca. 150 were born in Hungary.

In 1925 was established a Society of Hungarian-Language Workers in Uruguay They even had some influence within the Communist Party of Uruguay.

In 1936, Hungarian migrants established the Hungarian Home of Uruguay, an ethnic association.

There is also a small Jewish-Hungarian community, they established their own association in the 1920s, which in turn sent their representative to the Uruguayan Central Israeli Committee.

There is an immigrant branch of the Batthyány noble family.

Notable Hungarians in Uruguay
Past
 Francisco José Debali (1791-1859), composer of the National Anthem of Uruguay
 Carlos Végh Garzón (1902–1984), politician, Minister of Finance
 Alejandro Végh Villegas (1928-2017), economist, Minister of Economics and Finance 
Present
 Carlos Batthyány (born 1969), scientist, director of the local Institut Pasteur
 Déborah Gyurcsek (born 1978), female track and field athlete
 Adrian R. Krainer, biochemist and molecular geneticist
 Jorge Polgar (born 1967), economist
 Krisztián Vadócz (born 1985), professional footballer
 Carlos A. Vegh (born 1958), economist

See also
Hungary–Uruguay relations 
Hungarian diaspora
Immigration to Uruguay

References

External links
 Hungarian Home in Uruguay 
 Hungarian Home in Uruguay at Facebook
 Podcast of the Hungarian Home in Uruguay

Uruguay
Ethnic groups in Uruguay
Immigration to Uruguay
Hungary–Uruguay relations
European Uruguayan